Mayfield Secondary School is located in Caledon, Ontario, Canada. It is one of two Regional Arts Schools in the Peel District School Board.

Regional Arts Program

Four disciplines of art are hosted at Mayfield: drama, dance, music, and visual arts. Each has its own night to showcase the talents of the students at a junior (grades 9 and 10) and senior (grades 11 and 12) level. Their improv team also competes in various National competitions. Jazz, classical, and alternative music styles are offered.

Dance Program
Mayfield's dance program, part of the Regional Arts Program, accepts 50-60 students per year for the four-year program. It includes theoretical (dance history, culture, important figures in the dance world, the dance industry and different styles of dance) and practical components about the program. The program focuses primarily on classical ballet and modern dance; however, to ensure students are exposed to other styles of dance, the program brings in experienced instructors to hold workshops a few times per semester. In this way, students are able to learn important dance technique while experiencing other styles of dance such as jazz, hip hop, ballroom styles, and many other styles of dance from around the world.

Every year, the department prepares a winter dance production. Each year explores a different winter related theme but every other year, the department performs The Nutcracker. The department also prepares a spring show in May and themes for this show can vary greatly. Although during the winter show students are able to show off their dancing talent, during the May show, students are able to choreograph their own pieces and audition them into the show. Therefore, the show includes teacher and student choreography. Furthermore, the May show is largely organized by the Grade 12 students as their final leadership project.

Extracurricular activities

Sports Teams
 

Fall Teams (September - November)
Basketball (Senior and Junior Girls)
 Cross Country Running (Co-ed Varsity)
 Field Hockey (Girls Varsity)
 Flag Football (Girls Varsity)
 Football (Senior and Junior Boys)
 Golf (Co-ed Varsity)
 Tennis (Co-ed Varsity)
 Volleyball (Senior and Junior Boys)

Winter Teams (Dec - Mar)
 Alpine Skiing (Co-ed Varsity)
 Basketball (Senior and Junior Boys)
 Basketball (Junior Boys)
 Curling (Senior and Junior Girls)
 Curling (Junior Girls)
 Curling (Senior, Junior, and Open Boys)
 Curling (Senior and Junior Mixed)
 Hockey (Varsity Boys)
 Hockey (Varsity Girls)
 Nordic Skiing (Co-ed Varsity)
 Wrestling (Co-ed Varsity)
 Volleyball (Senior and Junior Girls)

Spring Teams (April - June)
Badminton (Co-ed Varsity)
 Baseball (Boys Varsity)
 Ping Pong (Co-ed Varsity)
 Archery (Co-ed Varsity)
 Fastpitch Softball (Girls Varsity)
 Lacrosse (Boys Varsity)
 Lacrosse (Girls Varsity)
 Rowing (Varsity)
 Rugby (Senior and Junior Boys)
 Rugby (Senior and Junior Girls)
 Soccer (Senior and Junior Boys)
 Soccer (Senior and Junior Girls)
 Track and Field (Co-ed Varsity)

Notable alumni
 Kyle Quincey, NHL Defenceman
 Megan Bonnell, folk musician
 Clifton Brown, Muay Thai Kickboxer (Grade 9)
 Lara Jean Chorostecki, actor
 Ashley Comeau, actor/Second City alumna/television writer/producer
 Paulo Costanzo, actor
 Director X, music video director Julien Lutz
 Jordan Gavaris, actor
 Michaela Hinds, World Champion Irish dancer
 Jake Holden, Olympic snowboarder
 Kris Lemche, actor
 Nicholas Lindsay, MLS soccer player (Toronto FC)
 Malgosia Majewska, Miss World Canada 2006
 Brittany Raymond, actress and dancer, on The Next Step
 Kyle Seeback, former MP, Brampton West
 Skye Sweetnam, musician 
 Brittany Webster, cross-country skier
 Ian Williams, Giller Prize-winning author
 Dave Greszczyszyn, Skeleton Olympian
 Brandie Wilkerson, Beach Volleyball Olympian

See also
List of high schools in Ontario

References

External links
 Urban Exploration of Mayfield SS with picture gallery
 

Peel District School Board
High schools in Caledon, Ontario
Educational institutions established in 1969
1969 establishments in Ontario
Art schools in Canada